Andrei Pavel defeated Patrick Rafter in the final, 7–6(7–3), 2–6, 6–3 to win the men's singles tennis title at the 2001 Canadian Open.

Marat Safin was the defending champion, but lost in the first round to Nicolas Escudé.

Seeds
A champion seed is indicated in bold text while text in italics indicates the round in which that seed was eliminated.

  Gustavo Kuerten (third round)
  Marat Safin (first round, retired due to a knee injury)
  Andre Agassi (first round)
  Juan Carlos Ferrero (quarterfinals)
  Lleyton Hewitt (second round)
  Yevgeny Kafelnikov (first round)
  Tim Henman (second round)
  Àlex Corretja (withdrew)
  Patrick Rafter (final)
  Arnaud Clément (quarterfinals)
  Pete Sampras (withdrew)
  Thomas Enqvist (first round)
  Thomas Johansson (second round)
  Carlos Moyá (second round)
  Wayne Ferreira (first round)
  Jan-Michael Gambill (third round)
  Dominik Hrbatý (second round)

Draw

Finals

Top half

Section 1

Section 2

Bottom half

Section 3

Section 4

External links
 2001 Canada Masters Draw

2001 Canada Masters and the Rogers AT&T Cup
Singles